Ella Scott Lynch (born 27 September 1982 in Sydney) is an Australian actress. Her notable roles include Shirley Ryan in the series Love Child and Melbourne gangland barrister Nicola Gobbo in the Channel Nine mini-series Informer 3838.

Early life
Ella Scott Lynch attended St Catherine's School, Waverley, NSW. She is a graduate of the National Institute of Dramatic Arts.

Career
In 2005, she was cast in the soap opera Home and Away in the role of Hayley Lawson, previously played by Bec Cartwright, which she played until the end of that year.

In 2008 Lynch was cast as a regular in All Saints. Her character, nurse Claire Anderson, replaced Jolene Anderson's character Erika. Coincidentally, Kip Gamblin, who played Hayley's love interest Scott Hunter in Home and Away, also joined All Saints at that point.

In 2020 she appeared in Informer 3838 as the titular character, Melbourne gangland lawyer Nicola Gobbo. The mini-series was inspired by the real-life career of Gobbo, who was recruited by Victoria Police in the 1990s as an informer on crime figures such as drug kingpin Tony Mokbel.

Filmography

Film

Television

Theatre

References

External links

 Ella Scott Lynch
 All Saints recover from loss of cast-member Mark Priestley

Actresses from Sydney
1982 births
Living people
National Institute of Dramatic Art alumni
Australian film actresses
Australian stage actresses
Australian soap opera actresses